The 1956–57 Michigan Wolverines men's basketball team represented the University of Michigan in intercollegiate college basketball  during the 1956–57 NCAA University Division men's basketball season.  The team played its home games at Fielding H. Yost Field House (renamed Yost Ice Arena in 1973) on the school's campus in Ann Arbor, Michigan.  Under the direction of head coach William Perigo, the team finished tied for fifth in the Big Ten Conference.

Future College Football Hall of Famer Ron Kramer established the school career scoring record with 1,119.  The record last until 1961, when John Tidwell totaled 1386. Kramer served as team captain and earned team MVP for the third year in a row.

Team players drafted into the NBA
Five players from this team were selected in the NBA Draft. Ferguson accumulated no statistics. Kramer was a first round selection of the Green Bay Packers in the 1957 NFL Draft (fourth overall pick) and played in the NFL through the  season.

References

Michigan
Michigan Wolverines men's basketball seasons
Michigan Wolverines basketball
Michigan Wolverines basketball